Pavel Dmitrievich Barshak (Russian: Павел Дмитриевич Баршак; born 19 December 1980) is a Russian actor. He appeared in more than thirty films since 2002.

Early life
Pavel Barshak was born in Moscow, Russian SFSR, Soviet Union in southern Russia.

Selected filmography

References

External links 
 

1980 births
Living people
Male actors from Moscow
Russian male film actors
Russian male television actors
Russian male stage actors
Russian male voice actors